Sequoia Capital is an American venture capital firm. The firm is headquartered in Menlo Park, California, and specializes in seed stage, early stage, and growth stage investments in private companies across technology sectors. , Sequoia's total assets under management were approximately US$85 billion.

Sequoia is an umbrella brand for three different venture entities: one focused on the U.S. and Europe, another on India and Southeast Asia, and a third on China.

Notable successful investments by Sequoia Capital include Apple, Cisco, Google, Instagram, LinkedIn, PayPal, Reddit, Tumblr, WhatsApp, and Zoom.

History
Sequoia was founded by Don Valentine in 1972 in Menlo Park, California, at a time when the state’s venture capital industry was just beginning to develop.

Sequoia formed its first venture capital fund in 1974, and was an early investor in Atari the next year. In 1978, Sequoia became one of the first investors in Apple. Partners Doug Leone and Michael Moritz assumed leadership of the firm in 1996. 

In 1999, Sequoia established a dedicated investment fund for Israeli startups. In 2005, Sequoia Capital China was established, later followed by Sequoia Capital India.

In 2012, Moritz took a step back from the day-to-day operations of the firm. Leone became Global Managing Partner. Jim Goetz led Sequoia’s US business from 2012 until 2017, when he was succeeded by Roelof Botha.

In 2016, Sequoia hired Jess Lee, making her the first female investing partner in the United States in the firm's history.

In 2019, it was the most active VC fund company in India.

In March 2020, Sequoia announced it would hire Luciana Lixandru as its first partner based in Europe.

In October 2021, Sequoia announced it would implement a new fund structure for its U.S. and European business that would allow it to remain involved with companies after their public market debuts.

In March 2022, The Information reported that Sequoia Capital China was raising an $8 billion fund to invest in Chinese tech companies.

Investments
Sequoia Capital is structured as a limited liability company. Investors, referred to as limited partners, contribute money to a fund that the firm's general partners then invest in business ventures. Sequoia's limited partners have primarily been university endowments, charitable foundations, and other large institutions.

Sequoia specializes in seed stage, early stage, and growth stage investments in private technology companies, including those in the clean tech, consumer internet, crypto, financial services, healthcare, mobile, and robotics sectors. Sequoia has been recognized for its strong track record of early investments. The firm has also distinguished itself from other top venture capital firms by diversifying its investments and not just focusing on U.S. early-stage venture capital.

Sequoia is an umbrella brand for three different venture entities: one focused on the U.S. and Europe, another on India and Southeast Asia, and a third on China. 

In 2019, Sequoia made more new seed-stage investments than Series A deals. That same year, Hurun Research Institute identified Sequoia as the world's top unicorn investor, noting it had invested in one in five of all private companies valued at $1 billion or more.

In July 2021, Sequoia published a piece about "the Latin American startup opportunity" that signaled it would increase its focus there.

In October 2021, Sequoia announced the Sequoia Capital Fund, a new fund structure for its U.S. and European business. The fund structure is unique for VC funds as they are typically funds with a 10-year fund cycle instead of an open-ended evergreen fund. The Sequoia fund will no longer need to sell or distribute stock as in the usual VC fund cycle. Instead, limited partners who want liquidity can pull money out of the fund.  Sequoia also announced it would become a RIA which would allow the firm more flexibility in its investments.

In February 2022, Sequoia raised a $600 million Sequoia Crypto Fund. As one of the first sub-funds of Sequoia Capital Fund, the crypto fund will mainly invest in cryptocurrencies traded on third-party exchanges.

In June 2022, Sequoia announced that it had raised $2.85 billion in additional funds to invest in India and Southeast Asia. The amount of funds raised is also the largest to date for the company in both India and Southeast Asia.

Notable investments 
 2020s: BitClout, Bolt, FTX, Wiz, Loom, Shein strongDM
 2010s: 23andMe, StarkWare Industries,  Instacart, Klarna, Nubank, Snowflake, Stripe, WhatsApp, UiPath, Meituan, Pinduoduo, Dropbox, ByteDance
 2000s: Airbnb, Palo Alto Networks, ServiceNow, Unity Technologies, YouTube 
 1970s-1990s: Apple, Cisco, Google, Nvidia, Webvan

Programs and partnerships
In 2009, Sequoia launched its scout program, which functions as an individual investor network that provides founders and other individuals with capital to invest in promising early-stage startups. Sequoia Scouts have invested in over 1,000 companies. Sequoia was the first venture capital firm to offer a scout program, and the model has since been emulated by others in the industry. 

In December 2020, Sequoia expanded the scout program to Europe. 

In 2021, Sequoia partnered on the BLCK VC Scout Network to provide training and education to current and aspiring Black scouts.

In March 2022, Sequoia launched Arc, a structured program in which participants receive $1 million in funding to work with Sequoia partners in both London and Silicon Valley.

References

External links
 

Venture capital firms of the United States
Financial services companies based in California
Companies based in Menlo Park, California
American companies established in 1972
Financial services companies established in 1972
1972 establishments in California
Privately held companies based in California